The 2018 Hartford Hawks baseball team represented the University of Hartford in the 2018 NCAA Division I baseball season as a member of the America East Conference. The team was coached by Justin Blood and played their home games at Fiondella Field with select games being played at Dunkin' Donuts Park. 2018 was the most successful season in division one for Hartford baseball. Hartford captured the America East regular season and conference tournament championships for the first time in school history and advanced to the NCAA tournament.

Roster

Schedule and results

References

Hartford
2018 in sports in Connecticut
Hartford Hawks baseball seasons
America East Conference baseball champion seasons
Hartford